Colin Irwin may refer to:

 Colin Irwin (footballer) (born 1957), 1980s footballer
 Colin Irwin (journalist), music journalist